Mike Elliott is an American film producer, film director and writer. He has produced or co-produced over 100 films,<ref>{{cite web|title=Mike Elliott|url=http://www.filmbug.com/db/346415|quote=has produced more than one hundred feature and television films|publisher=Filmbug.com|access-date=March 10, 2012}}</ref> with a special focus on direct-to-video sequels.

Early life
Mike Elliott was born in Ventura, California but raised just outside Bend, Oregon.

He graduated from Cornell University with a degree in Soviet Studies.

Career
After landing intern positions at various television and film companies, Elliott found his footing interning for independent filmmaker Roger Corman and eventually became a vice-president at Corman's Concorde New Horizons, serving as liaison and producer with partner companies such as Showtime.

Elliot has said that “It got to a point where we shrugged our shoulders and slowly realized theatrical was about prestige more than it was a sales factor ... The box and the cast became more important."

In 1995, Elliott co-founded Capital Arts Entertainment with Rob Kerchner and Joe Genier.

Elliott and Capital Arts Entertainment would become pioneers in the direct-to-video sequel market, producing such films as Casper Meets Wendy, Addams Family Reunion, The Prince and Me 2, American Pie Presents: Band Camp, and Timecop 2: The Berlin Decision.

Elliott has produced After the Storm, WarGames: The Dead Code, The Eye, The Perfect Holiday, Rogue Assassin and Comic Book Villains. He made his directorial debut on Beethoven's Big Break in 2008, with sophomore directing effort Blue Crush 2 released on DVD and Blu-ray in 2011. Elliott's latest credits include Death Race 3: Inferno starring Luke Goss and Ving Rhames, Forced to Fight starring Gary Daniels and Peter Weller, and Dead in Tombstone'' with Danny Trejo.

Filmography

References

External links 
 

American film producers
American film directors
American male screenwriters
Living people
Year of birth missing (living people)